The Cross of St. George, commonly known as the Kragujevac Cross, is a monumental cross at the entrance of the city of Kragujevac, Serbia. It is 18 metres high, with the Crucifixion of Jesus on one side, and the icon of St. George on the other. It was blessed by Serbian Patriarch Irinej on July 21, 2010.

References

External links
 
 B92.net

Monumental crosses
Buildings and structures in Niš
2010 establishments in Serbia
Monuments and memorials in Serbia